Aedes communis also known as the woodland snow pool mosquito is a species of mosquito in the genus Aedes. It is common in New Jersey but can also be found in the Northern United States, Canada and Alaska. It is a known pollinator of Platanthera obtusata. Unlike other mosquito species, Aedes communis remains active during the winter.

References

communis